The Mystery of a Hansom Cab is an 1886 novel by Fergus Hume.

The Mystery of a Hansom Cab may also refer to:
 The Mystery of a Hansom Cab (1911 film), an Australian silent film
 The Mystery of a Hansom Cab (1915 film), a British silent film
 The Mystery of a Hansom Cab (1925 film), an Australian silent film
 The Mystery of a Hansom Cab (1935 film), a reissue of the 1925 film
 The Mystery of a Hansom Cab (1961 film), an Australian television drama
 The Mystery of a Hansom Cab (2012 film), an Australian television drama